Altgermanische Religionsgeschichte (Ancient Germanic Religious History), by Jan de Vries, was a survey of religious history first published in 1935-37 as Altgermanische Religionsgeschichte, Grundriss der germanischen Philologie, 12, 2 vols (Berlin: de Gruyter, 1935–37). A second, substantially revised edition was published with the same series numbering and publisher in 1956–57. A third edition in 1970 was a reprinting of the second.

Contents
The contents of the second edition are as follows:

Volume 1

Ch. 1: Allgemeine Erörterungen (§§1-16)

Ch. 2: Die Quellen der germanischen Religion (§§17-33)

Ch. 3: Geschichte der Forschung (§§34-61)

Ch. 4: Die vorgeschichtlichen Perioden (§§62-117)
 A. Allgemeines (§62)
 B. Die Steinzeit (§§63-71)
 C. Die Bronzezeit (§§72-93)
 D. Die Eisenzeit (§§94-117)
 Die südgermanischen Verhältnisse (§§95-101)
 Die skandinavische Eisenzeit (§§102-117)
Ch. 5: Die Umwelt der heidnischen Germanen (§§118-130)
 A. Die Verhältnisse in der römischen Germania (§§119-124)
 B. Die Völkerwanderungszeit und die Bekehrung zum Christentum (§§125-127)
 C. Die Umwelt der Nordgermanen (§§128-130)
Ch. 6: Die religiösen Grundlagen des Menschenlebens (§§131-152)
Ch. 7: Seelen, Geister und Dämonen, Schicksalsmächte (§§152-193)
 A. Einleitende Bemerkungen (§§152-157)
 B. Die Vorstellungen der Seele (§§158-171)
 C. Echte und angebliche Naturgeister (§§172-187)
 1. Die Riesen (§§172-179)
 2. Die Zwerge, Wichter und Elben (§§180-187)
 D. Dämonen in Tiergestalt (§§188-189)
 E. Schicksalsmächte (§§190-193)
Ch. 8: Macht und Kraft (§§194-239)

Ch. 9: Das Heilige und die Kultformen (§§240-340)
 A. Der Begriff des Heiligen (§§240-244)
 B. Der heilige Ort (§§245-252)
 C. Die Himmelskörper und das Feuer (§§253-256)
 D. Heilige Tiere und Gegenstände (ẞ257-263)
 E. Tempel und Götterbilder
 F. Das heilige Amt (§§274-281)
 G. Die Opferhandlung (§§282-293)
 H. Das Orakel (§§294-300)
 I. Kultlied, Gesang und Tanz (§§301-304)
 K. Die periodischen Kultfeiern (§§305-314)
 L. Die agrarischen Kulte (§§315-326)
 M. Die Kultverbände (§§327-340)
Volume 2

Ch. 10: Die Götter (§§341-569)
 A. Allgemeine Bemerkungen (§§341-346)
 B. Tîwaz—Týr (§§347-360)
 C. Wodan—Odin (§§361-412)
 D. Donar—Thor (§§413-442)
 E. Ullr und Ullinn (§§443-447)
 F. Die Wanen: Njǫrðr und Freyr (§§448-473)
 G. Der Krieg der Asen und der Wanen (§§474-475)
 H. Baldr (§§476-490)
 I. Heimdallr (§§491-495)
 K. Dioskurische Götter (§§496-500)
 L. Loki (§§501-508)
 M. Die übrigen Götter (§§509-521)
 N. Weibliche Gottheiten (§§522-562)
 1. Die in Gruppen auftretenden Gottheiten (§§522-530)
 2. Frîja—Frigg (§§531-533)
 3. Freyja (§§534-536)
 4. Die übrigen weiblichen Gottheiten (§§537-562)
 a. Die Göttinnen der Westgermanen (§§538-552)
 b. Die Göttinnen der Nordgermanen (§§553-562)
 O. Schlußbemerkungen (§§563-569)
Ch. 11: Vorstellungen über den Kosmos (§§570-598)
 A. Die Schöpfung (§§570-578)
 B. Das Weltbild (§§579-589)
 C. Das Weltende (§§590-598)
Ch. 12: Der Untergang des Heidentums (§§599-625)
Register

Germanic mythology
German books
Dutch books
Mythology books
Pagan studies books
1935 non-fiction books